Oh Joon (born 4 October 1955) is the former South Korean Ambassador to the United Nations (UN). He became South Korean Ambassador to the United Nations in September 2013. From July 24, 2015 to July 28, 2016, he was the 71st President of the UN Economic and Social Council.

In 2016, Oh was appointed by Erik Solheim, the Chairman of the Development Assistance Committee, to serve on the High Level Panel on the Future of the Development Assistance Committee under the leadership of Mary Robinson.

References

External links

Living people
1955 births
South Korean diplomats
Permanent Representatives of South Korea to the United Nations
Ambassadors to Singapore
Seoul National University alumni
Kyunggi High School alumni
People from Seoul
Haeju Oh clan
Alumni of the London School of Economics
Stanford University alumni